The 1964 New York Giants season was the franchise's 40th season in the National Football League. The resulting record of 2-10-2 was the worst record in the league that year, after being Eastern Conference Champions just a year prior. This would be the team's first losing season since 1953.

Offseason

Offseason Trades and Signings
The New York Giants decided to trade their star defensive player, Sam Huff, a middle linebacker, to the Washington Redskins. They receive young players, being defensive end Andy Stynchula, and halfback Dick James in return. This trade had easily become one of the most controversial and shocking trades in Giants history. The two young players had brought youth but made little impact to the team.

NFL Draft
The New York Giants have selected 20 draft picks in 20 rounds, with only 12 of them playing at all during their careers. All 12 players would be considered rookies their first year playing. One of the rookies, Lou Slaby, inherited the Middle Linebacker position that was left by Sam Huff only starting for 1 of his few years in the league.

Roster

Regular season

Schedule

Note: Intra-conference opponents are in bold text.

Game Summaries

Week 7: at Cleveland Browns

Week 14: vs. Cleveland Browns

Standings

Roster

Awards and honors

See also
List of New York Giants seasons

References

 
 
 

New York Giants seasons
New York Giants
New York Giants
1960s in the Bronx